Palatobaena is an extinct genus of baenid turtle. It was first named by Gaffney in 1972 and the type species is Palatobaena bairdi. It based on a fragmentary skull from the Fort Union Formation of the Bighorn Basin of Wyoming. The two other species are P. gaffneyi (a complete skull from Eocene (Wasatchian North American Land Mammal Age)) and P. cohen which existed in Hell Creek Formation, North Dakota during the late Cretaceous period (Maastrichtian age).

References

Baenidae
Prehistoric turtle genera
Late Cretaceous turtles
Paleocene turtles
Eocene turtles
Prehistoric turtles of North America
Hell Creek fauna
Fossil taxa described in 1972
Taxa named by Eugene S. Gaffney